Oakdene (later known as Waldene and then as Bernora) was a Gold Coast-era estate in Roslyn, on Long Island, in New York.

History 
Oakdene was constructed for executive Walter George Oakman, Sr. ca. 1900. The main building, a Colonial Revival mansion consisting of around 32 rooms (although some sources say 37), was designed by Grosvenor Atterbury. The estate also consisted of farm buildings and a horse stable.

Henry D. Walbridge purchased the estate in 1912. He renamed the estate from Oakdene to Waldene. It is known that the Walbridge family had installed a pipe organ in the mansion.

In 1935, Waldene was put on the market for $297,500 (1935 USD).

Around 1946, Waldene was purchased by Samuel Rubel. Rubel renamed the mansion Bernora.

Fate 
In 1946, the mansion was destroyed by a fire. The property was soon purchased by developers. After the developers purchased the property, the estate was redeveloped as a housing development called Roslyn Pines in the early 1950s.

See also 

 Harbor Hill – Another Gold Coast estate in the Greater Roslyn area, in nearby East Hills.

References 

Roslyn, New York
Mansions of Gold Coast, Long Island
Houses in Nassau County, New York
Demolished buildings and structures in New York (state)